Allison Curbishley (born 3 June 1976) is a former British athlete from Stockton-on-Tees but who represented Scotland. She specialised in the 400m. A play scheme in the summer holiday when she was ten years old got Curbishley interested in sport and although athletics was the sport she eventually chose she also reached county standard in netball and field hockey.

She graduated from the University of Birmingham with a degree in Sport and Exercise Sciences. During her career her knee was operated on six times, and the injury finally led to her retirement in 2003. She is now working in broadcasting for the BBC and her partner is fellow BBC commentator Steve Cram with whom she lives in Northumberland.

International competitions

References

 Olympic Profile

1976 births
Living people
English people of Scottish descent
Sportspeople from Stockton-on-Tees
Sportspeople from Newcastle upon Tyne
Scottish female sprinters
British female sprinters
Olympic athletes of Great Britain
Athletes (track and field) at the 1996 Summer Olympics
Athletes (track and field) at the 2000 Summer Olympics
Commonwealth Games silver medallists for Scotland
Commonwealth Games medallists in athletics
Athletes (track and field) at the 1998 Commonwealth Games
World Athletics Championships athletes for Great Britain
European Athletics Championships medalists
Alumni of the University of Birmingham
Universiade medalists in athletics (track and field)
Universiade gold medalists for Great Britain
Medalists at the 1997 Summer Universiade
Olympic female sprinters
Medallists at the 1998 Commonwealth Games